Mamintal M. Adiong Sr. (August 8, 1936 – July 3, 2004) was a long-time Filipino politician, serving as Governor of Lanao del Sur from 2001 until his death from cardiac arrest.  He also served three terms as Representative of Lanao del Sur to the Philippine Congress in 1992–2001.  He was largely credited for the landslide victory of President Arroyo and her slate in the 2004 elections.

References

Members of the House of Representatives of the Philippines from Lanao del Sur
Lakas–CMD politicians
1936 births
2004 deaths
People from Lanao del Sur
Filipino Muslims